Supe or SUPE may refer to:

Places
 Supe District, Peru
 Supe, Ethiopia, a town in the woreda of Supena Sodo
 Supa, Parner, a village in India, also known as Supe

Other uses
 Unión Supe, a football club in Supe, Peru
 Superessive case, a grammatical case abbreviated SUPE
 Michael "Supe" Granda, a member of Trent Summar & the New Row Mob, an American country music group
 Supe, nickname of the title character of Superkatt, an American comic book series
 Supe, a fictional superhuman in the comic book series The Boys
 El Jagüel Airport (ICAO: SUPE), an airport in Punta del Este, Uruguay
 Short for supernumerary actor

See also
 Supes (disambiguation)